The 17th Saturn Awards, honoring the best in science fiction, fantasy and horror film and television in 1989 and 1990, were held on June 26, 1991.

Winners and nominees 
Below is a complete list of nominees and winners. Winners are highlighted in bold.

Film

Television

Special awards

The George Pal Memorial Award 
 William Friedkin

Special Award 
 Michael Biehn
 Watson Garman

The President's Award 
 Batman

References

External links
 Official Website 

Saturn Awards ceremonies
1991 film awards
1991 television awards